José Segundo Roca (July 1, 1800 – March 8, 1866) was an Argentine colonel. He took part in the second Upper Peru campaign, and died during the War of the Triple Alliance.

He was born in Tucumán, the son of Pedro Roca, born in Tarragona, and María Antonia Tejerina, a Creole from Tucumán. He was married to Josefa Agustina Paz, daughter of Juan Bautista de Paz and María Plácida Pereyra, belonging to a distinguished family. He and his wife were the parents of numerous children, including General Julio Argentino Roca, who was twice President of Argentina.

References

External links
 

People of the Argentine War of Independence
Argentine military personnel of the Paraguayan War
Argentine colonels
People from San Miguel de Tucumán
1800 births
1866 deaths
Burials at La Recoleta Cemetery
People of the Spanish American wars of independence
People of the Latin American wars of independence